Lai Shiu Wing (1917–26 July 1988) was a former professional footballer. He was a member of China national team. He was the head coach of Hong Kong national football team.

He previously played for Hong Kong football clubs Kitchee, Eastern, Sing Tao SC and South China.

References

1917 births
1988 deaths
Hong Kong footballers
Olympic footballers of China
Footballers at the 1948 Summer Olympics
China international footballers
Chinese footballers
Kitchee SC players
Eastern Sports Club footballers
South China AA players
Association football forwards
Hong Kong national football team managers